Phostria albirenalis is a moth in the family Crambidae. It was described by George Hampson in 1899. It is found in Pará, Brazil.

References

Phostria
Moths described in 1899
Moths of South America